A shark attack is a biting incident involving a shark.

Shark Attack may also refer to:

Lists of shark attacks
 International Shark Attack File, a global database of shark attacks
 Shark attacks in South Australia
 Lists of fatal shark attacks

Films
 Jersey Shore: Shark Attack (2012 film), a SyFy telemovie monster film
 Malibu Shark Attack (2009 film), a SyFy telemovie monster film in the Maneater film series produced by RHI Entertainment
 Spring Break: Shark Attack (2005 film), a CBS telefilm monster movie
 Shark Attack (film), a 1999 monster film telemovie produced by Nu Image Films
 Shark Attack 2, a 2000 direct-to-video monster film produced by Nu Image Films
 Shark Attack 3: Megalodon, a 2002 direct-to-video monster film produced by Nu Image Films
 2-Headed Shark Attack, a 2012 SyFy telefilm monster movie produced by The Asylum
 3-Headed Shark Attack, a 2015 SyFy telefilm monster movie produced by The Asylum
 5-Headed Shark Attack, a 2017 SyFy telefilm monster movie produced by The Asylum

Music
"Shark Attack", a 2013 song by Grouplove from Spreading Rumours.
"Shark Attack", a song by Math the Band.

See also
 
 Shark attack prevention
 List of killer shark films
 Attack (disambiguation)
 Shark (disambiguation)